The 32nd Virginia Infantry Regiment was an infantry regiment raised in Virginia for service in the Confederate States Army during the American Civil War. It fought mostly with the Army of Northern Virginia.

The 32nd Virginia was formed in May, 1861, by consolidating Montague's and Goggin's Infantry Battalions. Its members were from Hampton and Williamsburg and the counties of Warwick, James City, and York. Three companies were accepted into service as artillery and were transferred to the 1st Virginia Artillery.

After its reorganization in May, 1862, the unit operated with only seven companies. At the Battle of Williamsburg two companies fought under General Pryor, then the regiment was attached to General Semmes' and Corse's Brigade. It participated in many conflicts from the Seven Days' Battles to Fredericksburg, moved with Longstreet to Suffolk, and later served in the Department of Richmond and in North Carolina. Returning to Virginia it was active at Drewry's Bluff and Cold Harbor, took its place in the Petersburg trenches north and south of the James River, they saw action on the Chickahominy (May 1864), at Cold Harbor (June), on the Petersburg Campaign (to April 1865), and ended the war at Appomattox.

The regiment reported 1 wounded at Savage's Station, had 2 killed and 4 wounded at Malvern Hill, and sustained 72 casualties of the 158 engaged at Sharpsburg. Some were captured at Sayler's Creek, and 5 officers and 42 men were included in the surrender.

The field officers were Colonels Benjamin S. Ewell and Edgar B. Montague; Lieutenant Colonels John B. Cary and William R. Willis; and Majors James M. Goggin, Baker P. Lee, Jr., and Jefferson Sinclair.

Below is a roll call (date unknown) for the "York Rangers" Co. I, 32nd Regiment Va. Infantry:
 Capt. - Jefferson Sinclair
 1st Lieut. -Wm. J. Stores
 2nd Lieut. - Robert Willis
 3rd Lieut. - Henry Sinclair (Brother to Jefferson)

Privates:
 Amory, John
 Ayers, Henry
 Barrow, Albert (Captured in Yorktown, sent to Fort Delaware)
 Boutwell, Wm
 Banting, Joseph
 Bassett, W.E.
 Briggs, Benj.
 Burt, Wm.
 Buchanan, Elijah
 Bunting, Wirt
 Cox, G.B.
 Cox, Elias
 Cox, George
 Carmines, Kenneth
 Cain, Thomas
 Candy, Thomas
 Cratzer, Edgar
 Crockett, Addison
 Davis, Charles
 Dawson, Humphrey
 Dawson, Robert
 Elliott, Seaton
 Foster, Elijah
 Firth, Thomas
 Forrest, Robert
 Forsythe, Thomas
 Freeman, Henry
 Glover, Charles
 Goffigan, W.E.
 Gordon, J.
 Gordon, Wm.
 Hansford, Louis
 Haskins, John Robert (Musician, Drummer, of the Cumberland County Va. Haskins's)
 Haskins, William Creed (older brother of John Robert Haskins)
 Hopkins, George
 Hopkins, Frank
 Halls, Jim
 Halloway, Wm. (Captured at Yorktown. Sent to Fort Delaware)
 Howard, J.T.
 Herbert, Thomas
 Hugett, J.
 Hunt, Benj.
 Hunt, Wm.
 Insley, Jas.
 Insley, Wm.
 Moreland, Alphonso
 Moreland, Darius
 Moore, E.B.
 Moore, Wm.
 Moore, Merrett
 Mason, George
 Patrick, Robert
 Patrick, Wm.
 Payne, Reiley
 Peek, E.K.
 Poole, Alex
 Poole, Robert
 Presson, Robert
 Presson, John
 Quimby, Wm.
 Rowe, Benj.
 Sheilds, Arthur
 Treen, Wm.
 Traynam, W.H.
 Vernam, Henry
 Vernam, Wm.
 Vixon, Wm.
 Watson, George
 White, J.
 White, Robert
 White, Wise
 Williams, Charles
 Wynne, Frank Lee
 Wynne, Edmund Thomas
 Wynne, Richard Henry

In the Sharpsburg Campaign:
The 32nd were position at Brownsville just behind Cramptons Gap on the 14th but were not engaged. They marched all night and arrived on the battlefield at Sharpsburg on the morning of the 17th. They were rushed to the left of the Confederate line about 9am as reinforcements as the remnants of Hood's Division fell back after their assault. The 32nd, with the rest of the Brigade, attacked north along the Hagerstown Pike from near the Dunker Church, and were successful in pushing the Federal infantry back to Poffenberger's Farm and their artillery, but suffered high casualties in doing so. After withdrawing to the West Woods for ammunition and rest, the Regiment was posted behind the Sunken Road near the Confederate Center for the afternoon, under long-range artillery fire, but not directly engaged.

See also

List of Virginia Civil War units

References

Findagrave listing for Sgt. Samuel T. Face, Company E, 32nd Virginia Infantry, Killed at the Battle of Antietam (Sharpsburg); includes first-person account of the scene after the battle, including finding the bodies of Face and "Elijah Benjamin, Lt. James Dye, Lt. Mony Wynne"
Antietam.aotw.org

Units and formations of the Confederate States Army from Virginia
1861 establishments in Virginia
Military units and formations established in 1861
1865 disestablishments in Virginia
Military units and formations disestablished in 1865